Wasp waist is a women's fashion silhouette, produced by a style of corset and  girdle, that has experienced various periods of popularity in the 19th and 20th centuries. Its primary feature is the abrupt transition from a natural-width rib cage to an exceedingly small waist, with the hips curving out below. It takes its name from its similarity to a wasp's segmented body. The sharply cinched waistline also exaggerates the hips and bust.

History
Ladies' magazines told of the side effects of tight lacing, proclaiming that "if a lady binds and girds herself in, until she be only twenty-three inches, and, in some cases, until she be only twenty-one inches, it must be done at the expense of comfort, health, and happiness." Fashions instead created the illusion of a small waist, using proportion, stripe placement, and color. Retouching photographs was sometimes used to create the illusion of a wasp waist.

Extreme tight lacing was a fad during the late 1870s and 1880s, ending in around 1887.

Health effects
Among the multitude of medical problems women suffered to achieve these drastic measurements were deformed ribs, weakened abdominal muscles, deformed and dislocated internal organs, and respiratory ailments. Displacement and disfigurement of the reproductive organs greatly increased the risk of miscarriage and maternal death.

See also
 Corset controversy
 Foot binding
 Tightlacing

Notes

19th-century fashion
20th-century fashion
Corsetry